Eugène Joanna Alfons "Gene" Bervoets (born 26 March 1956 in Antwerp) is a Belgian actor. He has performed in more than 60 films since 1979.

Selected filmography

References

External links 
 

1956 births
Living people
21st-century Flemish male actors
Actors from Antwerp
20th-century Flemish male actors
Flemish male film actors